The R727 is a Regional Route in Free State, South Africa.

Route
Its western terminus is the R30 and R59 at Bothaville. It runs east, ending at the R76 between Kroonstad and Viljoenskroon.

References 

Regional Routes in the Free State (province)